St. George's Parish is one of the nine parishes of Bermuda. It is named after the founder of the Bermuda colony, Admiral Sir George Somers.

It is located in the north-easternmost part of the island chain, containing a small part of the main island around Tucker's Town and the Tucker's Town Peninsula, as well as the island of St. George, and many smaller islands, notably Coney, Paget, Nonsuch, Castle, and Smith's Islands.

Technically, St. George's also includes the island of St. David's, though this is often considered a separate entity. St. David's Island, and Cooper's Island, and Longbird Island became a single, contiguous landmass during the Second World War construction of what is now L.F. Wade International Airport, formerly a joint USAAF/RAF base, Kindley Field (and subsequently a USAF base, Kindley Air Force Base, then a US Navy air station, NAS Bermuda.

The parish is joined to Hamilton Parish in the south, via The Causeway (which, like the Florida Keys in the United States, is a chain of small islands which have been connected by reclaimed land and bridges) and also at Tucker's Town. The parish is unique among those in Bermuda, in that it does not cover exactly 2.3 square miles (about 6.0 km² or 1500 acres). The reason for this is the land reclamation that took place when Kindley Air Force Base was constructed, which expanded the parish's area by some 150 acres (60 hectares) to a little over 2.5 square miles (6.6 km², 1620 acres). It had a population of 5,659 in 2016, representing about 9 percent of the total Bermudan population.

Natural features in St. George's include Castle Harbour, St. George's Harbour, St. David's Head, Tobacco Bay, and Ferry Reach.

Other notable features of St. George's include the St. David's Lighthouse, Fort St. Catherine, and the Bermuda Biological Station for Research.

Education
Primary schools:
 St. George's Preschool
 St. David's Preschool on St. David's
 St. George's Primary School in St. George's
 East End Primary School on St. George's Island
 St. David's Primary School on St. David's

Clearwater Middle School is located on St. David's. It opened on September 6, 1997 in the former Roger B. Chaffee High School with 155  students originating from the former St. George's Secondary School.

References

External links
Bermuda Online

 
Parishes of Bermuda